Len Williams is a former Canadian Football League quarterback.

After playing his college football at Northwestern University, Williams played 17 games with the Las Vegas Posse in 1994, completing 80 of 138 passes for 1222 yards, 10 touchdowns and 8 interceptions. He also rushed for 86 yards and one touchdown. He played one season for the Calgary Stampeders.

References

1971 births
Living people
Calgary Stampeders players
Las Vegas Posse players
African-American players of Canadian football
American football quarterbacks
Canadian football quarterbacks
Northwestern Wildcats football players
21st-century African-American sportspeople
20th-century African-American sportspeople